Love Hurts is a 1990 American comedy-drama film co-produced and directed by Bud Yorkin, starring Jeff Daniels, Cynthia Sikes, Cloris Leachman, Judith Ivey and John Mahoney.

Daniels plays a womanizer who goes home to Pennsylvania for a wedding and finds his past catching up with him.

The film has been released on DVD by Lions Gate Home Entertainment as a double feature with You Can't Hurry Love.

Plot
Paul Weaver (Jeff Daniels) is accustomed to playing around on his wife Nancy (Cynthia Sikes) from his baseball-playing days. When divorce papers are filed against him, Paul decides to travel to Pennsylvania and attend his sister's wedding. But Nancy and his two children are both there, making the situation uncomfortable for everyone.

Cast
 Jeff Daniels as Paul Weaver
 Judith Ivey as Susan Volcheck
 Cloris Leachman as Ruth Weaver
 John Mahoney as Boomer
 Cynthia Sikes as Nancy Weaver
 Annabelle Weenick as Miriam Whipkey
 Amy Wright as Karen Weaver

External links
 
 
 

1990 films
1990 independent films
1990s romantic comedy-drama films
American independent films
American romantic comedy-drama films
Films set in Philadelphia
Vestron Pictures films
Films directed by Bud Yorkin
Films scored by Burt Bacharach
1990 comedy films
1990 drama films
1990s English-language films
1990s American films